Darla Kay Anderson (born October 22, 1968) is an American film producer who formerly worked at Pixar Animation Studios. She sits on the national board of directors for the Producers Guild of America.

Life and career
She produced the 2010 film Toy Story 3, which was nominated for the 2011 Academy Award for Best Picture and which won the 2011 Academy Award for Best Animated Feature.

Previously, Anderson won a Golden Satellite Award for A Bug's Life, a BAFTA award for A Bug's Life and Monsters, Inc. and a Producer's Guild Award for Cars.

The 2008 Guinness Book of World Records lists Anderson as having the highest average movie gross for a producer: $221 million per movie, and in 2011 the Wall Street Journal listed a combined gross for the four movies she's produced of over $2 billion.

Anderson was born and raised in Glendale, California. She studied environmental design at San Diego State University. Before coming to Pixar in 1993, she worked as an executive producer at Angel Studios. The character Darla in Finding Nemo was created by the director and screenwriter Andrew Stanton to get back at her for playing practical jokes on him.

On March 8, 2018, it was announced that Anderson left Pixar to pursue other opportunities. In January 2019, it was reported that Anderson had signed a multi-year development deal with Netflix, in which she will develop and produce new animated and live-action projects.

Personal life
Anderson is married to Kori Rae, also a Pixar producer, who produced Monsters University. They live together in Noe Valley, San Francisco.

They met in 1991 when Anderson, a San Francisco newcomer, joined a softball team that Rae managed. Anderson and Rae started dating in 2001, during the last year of Monsters, Inc. Since then, they have decided not to work together on the same films. They first married on Presidents' Day 2004 while San Francisco was issuing same-sex marriage licenses, but those licenses were voided by the state Supreme Court.

They married again in 2008, after that court declared same-sex marriage legal but before Proposition 8 took effect.

Anderson's nephew, Jack Taylor, scored an NCAA  record 138 points playing college basketball. She helped him pay to attend basketball camps at upper-tier colleges while he was growing up.

Filmography

See also
 List of LGBT Academy Award winners and nominees

References

External links

1968 births
Living people
LGBT people from California
American animated film producers
American women film producers
American film producers
LGBT film producers
Pixar people
People from Glendale, California
San Diego State University alumni
Producers who won the Best Animated Feature Academy Award